Xendo, Inc. is an enterprise search company headquartered in San Francisco, California.   Xendo operates a Software-as-a-Service (SaaS) platform of the same name which enables professional knowledge workers with Unified Search across 30+ enterprise cloud applications (like Salesforce, Google Apps, Asana, Trello and more) and includes connectors to integrate on-premises and proprietary systems.

Xendo provides deep, full-text search with advanced filter capabilities like proximity searching and OCR.   Using NLP and Entity Extraction, Xendo enhances relevance and derives insights latent in textual content (such as documents, emails, calendar events, tasks). Xendo is pre-integrated with Single Sign-On (SSO) solutions like Okta and OneLogin, so users can seamlessly find and securely access their content wherever it is.

Launched at TechCrunch Disrupt Battlefield in San Francisco in September 2014, Xendo is now used in over 1000 companies. The Xendo Chrome Extension was cited by MakeUseOf and Lifehacker as "the top [Chrome] extension for searching all of your cloud accounts".  Xendo was acquired  by AppDirect and continues to grow as a wholly owned subsidiary.

References

External links 
 Xendo, Inc. website
 Xendo Chrome Extension

Companies based in San Francisco
American companies established in 2013
Internet search engines